Lorenzo Suber (born June 10, 1912 in Bagnaria Arsa) was an Italian professional football player.

Honours
 Coppa Italia winner: 1938/39.

1912 births
Year of death missing
Italian footballers
Serie A players
Udinese Calcio players
Pisa S.C. players
Venezia F.C. players
Inter Milan players
Association football midfielders